Real Romance Love Letter was a South Korean television game show broadcast from 16 October 2004 to 28 October 2006 for three seasons. It was part of the line-up of programme for Real Situation Saturday (Korean: 실제상황! 토요일) which was broadcast from 8 November 2003 to 5 January 2007 on SBS network.

MC was Kang Ho Dong and it featured male and female contestants competing for "each other" in romance games. For example, guests have to dance in order to impress the person they are after. Contestants were artists, actors, models, comedians, and MCs of the South Korean entertainment industry.

Format
Season one: Each recording is divided and broadcast as two episodes in consecutive weeks. During the show various games are played. At the end of part 1 the female guest chooses two contestants to go on dates with, and the rest goes into training camp. At the end of part 2 the female guest chooses her "Perfect Man" and declared as the winner, who gets a "Perfect Man" pin and a kiss on the cheek from the guest.

Contestants
Past contestants includes:
 Shinhwa members: Eric Mun, Lee Min-woo, Kim Dong-wan, Shin Hye-sung, Jun Jin, Andy
 Kim Jong-kook
 Shin Jung-hwan
 NRG members: Chun Myung-hoon, Lee Sungjin
 Kim Jong-min
 Super Junior members: Choi Siwon, Han Geng, Kim Heechul, Lee Donghae, Lee Sungmin
 SS501 members
 Han Hyo-joo
 Chae Yeon
 Jeon Hye-bin
 Hwangbo
 Bae Seul-ki
 Jang Woo-hyuk
 Yoo Ri
 Tablo
 Hwang Jung-eum
 Ayumi Lee
 Sol Bi
 Kang Ho-dong
 Ha Ji-won

Episodes

References

External links
 Official website

Seoul Broadcasting System original programming
South Korean game shows
2004 South Korean television series debuts